Theodora Turner,  (5 August 1907 – 24 August 1999) was a British nurse and hospital matron.

Early years and education 
Theodora Turner was born on 5 August 1907 in Congleton, Cheshire, one of five children. Her father later became Conservative Party agent in Salisbury where she attended the Godolphin School, Salisbury.

Her parents initially sent her to study at Atholl Crescent, the Edinburgh School of Domestic Science but Turner wishes to become a nurse and, with her parents consent, entered St Thomas' Hospital and the Nightingale School of Nursing in the summer of 1929. She completed her training as a nurse with the silver medal, but declined to join the League of St Barnabas, an Anglican society for nurses against the suggestion of the matron, Dame Alicia Lloyd-Still. She took her midwifery training at the Radcliffe Infirmary, Oxford, then returned to St Thomas' Hospital as a ward nursing sister.

Second World War 
When war broke out in 1939 she joined the Queen Alexandra's Imperial Military Nursing Service (QARANC), was mobilised at Congleton, was present during the evacuation from Dunkirk, and served in, among other places, Iran and Italy.

Later career 
On her return to civilian life she was named administrative sister at St Thomas' as preparation for her appointment as matron of Liverpool's  Royal Infirmary.

Turner left in 1953 to care for her elderly parents. When she was free from family commitments she was appointed matron and lady superintendent of nurses of St Thomas' when the hospital was being rebuilt after being hit 13 times by German bombs. Turner deputised as a Royal College of Nursing representative on the Whitley Council which negotiated nurses' salaries. After retiring, she became president of the RCN. She later relocated to Scotland, where she served on the  Argyll and Clyde Health Board.

Death
Theodora Turner died at Wantage, Oxfordshire, aged 92, from old age.

Curriculum vitae
 ARRC, 1944
 Education Officer, Education Centre, Royal College of Nursing, Birmingham, 1953–55 
 Matron, St Thomas' Hospital and Superintendent, Nightingale Training School, 1955–65 
 President, Royal College of Nursing, 1966–68 
 President, International Council of Nurses, 1971–74

References

1907 births
1999 deaths
English nurses
British nursing administrators
British women in World War II
Officers of the Order of the British Empire
People from Congleton
People educated at Godolphin School
Associate Members of the Royal Red Cross
Presidents of the Royal College of Nursing
Queen Alexandra's Royal Army Nursing Corps officers
British Army personnel of World War II